Austin Punch (16 August 1894 – 25 August 1985) was an Australian cricketer. He played one first-class match for Tasmania in 1927/28 and 32 matches for New South Wales between 1919/20 and 1928/29.

See also
 List of Tasmanian representative cricketers
 List of New South Wales representative cricketers

References

External links
 

1894 births
1985 deaths
Australian cricketers
New South Wales cricketers
Tasmania cricketers
Cricketers from Sydney